H13 is a national road (H-Highway) in Lviv Oblast and Zakarpattia Oblast, Ukraine. It runs north-south and connects Uzhhorod with Lviv.

Main route
Main route and connections to/intersections with other highways in Ukraine.

See also

 Roads in Ukraine

References

External links
Regional Roads in Ukraine in Russian

Roads in Zakarpattia Oblast
Roads in Lviv Oblast